Mbala Henri Balenga (born 17 December 1966) is a retired Congolese football striker. He was a squad member at the 1992 Africa Cup of Nations.

References

1966 births
Living people
Democratic Republic of the Congo footballers
Democratic Republic of the Congo international footballers
1992 African Cup of Nations players
Royal Antwerp F.C. players
K. Boom F.C. players
K.A.A. Gent players
K.S.V. Waregem players
R.E. Virton players
F91 Dudelange players
Association football forwards
Democratic Republic of the Congo expatriate footballers
Expatriate footballers in Belgium
Democratic Republic of the Congo expatriate sportspeople in Belgium
Belgian Pro League players
Expatriate footballers in Luxembourg
Democratic Republic of the Congo expatriate sportspeople in Luxembourg
21st-century Democratic Republic of the Congo people